Ray Church is a medieval church and National Monument in County Donegal, Ireland.

Location

History

St Fionnán founded this church in the 6th century. Ray stood next to the Ray River, an ancient boundary between the Cenél Luighdech and Cenél Duach. Four 7th-century abbots of Iona were of the Cenél Duach; Ray was almost certainly their home church.

Ray high cross is the largest early medieval stone cross in Ireland. Local lore claims it was made by Columba (521–597) on Muckish to bring to Tory Island, but local saint Fionnán recovered Columba's Gospel Book and he gave the cross to Ray. The cross actually dates to the late 8th century.

The church was destroyed by Oliver Cromwell's soldiers in the 17th century. During Sunday Mass, the entire congregation was slaughtered in the Massacre of Ray (Marfach Ráithe). The dead are buried in a mass grave called Resting Place of the Bones (Lag na gCnámh).

The cross was knocked down in a storm about 1750, and lay broken in the graveyard until it was repaired by the Office of Public Works in the 1970s.

Buildings

Church

The church is rectangular with wide round-arched windows.

Cross

Nearby
A basin stone and standing stone are nearby.

References

External links

Religion in County Donegal
Archaeological sites in County Donegal
National Monuments in County Donegal
Former churches in the Republic of Ireland